Francisco "Paco" Herrera Lorenzo (born 2 December 1953) is a Spanish retired footballer who played as a midfielder, and is a manager.

His managerial career of over a quarter of a century was spent mostly in Segunda División, where he led 13 clubs and won promotion to La Liga with Celta and Las Palmas.

Playing career
Born in Barcelona, Catalonia, Herrera started playing professionally with CE Sabadell FC in his native region, appearing in two Segunda División seasons with the team. In 1974, the 20-year-old signed for Sporting de Gijón in La Liga, suffering relegation in his second year.

After a two-season spell with Levante UD, Herrera retired from football with CD Badajoz in 1986 at the age of 32, having played mainly for the Extremaduran in Segunda División B, the new third level created in 1977.

Coaching career
Herrera was connected to his last club, Badajoz, for several years as a manager, first coaching its youth sides and later acting as assistant. He would manage the first team in 24 games in two separate second division campaigns (18 in 1992–93 and six in 1994–95).

During three seasons, Herrera then worked in the second level, with CD Numancia and CP Mérida, the only complete one being 1998–99. He was sacked by the latter in late November 1999, following a 1–3 loss at former club Levante; the team eventually ranked sixth, being however demoted due to financial irregularities.

After two seasons in division two, with Albacete Balompié and Polideportivo Ejido (finishing in tenth and 13th position respectively), Herrera was appointed at Recreativo de Huelva in the same tier, being fired on 9 November 2003 after a 0–2 home loss against Andalusia neighbours Córdoba CF – the team had collected seven draws in 11 matches (plus two wins and as many losses). In the summer of 2004, he joined countryman Rafael Benítez's coaching staff in Liverpool, working as both assistant manager and chief scout for two years.

Herrera left England in June 2006 and returned to his country, serving as director of football at RCD Espanyol for three seasons. He left the club in February 2009 to manage CD Castellón, replacing Atlético Madrid-bound Abel Resino for the final 21 games of the campaign and leading the Valencians to the seventh place in the second division.

On 4 February 2010, Herrera replaced Juan Carlos Garrido at the helm of Villarreal CF' reserves, also in the second division, as Garrido had been promoted to the main squad following the sacking of Ernesto Valverde. In 2010–11 he continued working in level two, with RC Celta de Vigo, leading them to the promotion play-offs where they lost in the semi-finals against Granada CF, on penalties.

Herrera was also in charge as the Galicians returned to the top flight at the end of the 2011–12 season, as runners-up. He was relieved of his duties on 18 February 2013 after a 1–3 away loss against Getafe CF, however, with the club ranking third from bottom but eventually saved.

Herrera was appointed at UD Las Palmas in the second division, on 3 July 2014. He achieved promotion in his first season, with the team returning to the top tier after 13 years.

On 19 October 2015, after a 0–4 defeat at Getafe CF that left the Canarians ranking second from the bottom, Herrera was sacked and replaced by Quique Setién. On 7 June of the following year, he was named Real Valladolid manager.

On 15 June 2017, Herrera was hired as Sporting de Gijón coach after agreeing to a two-year contract. He was sacked on 12 December, after a streak of six matches without wins in the second level.

Herrera returned to active on 31 May 2018, being appointed at Aris Thessaloniki F.C. from the Superleague Greece. On 5 November, after four consecutive league defeats, his contract was terminated by mutual consent.

On 16 November 2018, Herrera returned to Las Palmas after three years, replacing sacked Manolo Jiménez. On 4 March 2019, he was himself dismissed after only winning three of 14 league games.

On 6 July 2019, Herrera joined the coaching staff at Birmingham City, becoming assistant head coach to Pep Clotet.

Managerial statistics

References

External links

1953 births
Living people
Footballers from Barcelona
Spanish footballers
Catalonia international footballers
Association football midfielders
La Liga players
Segunda División players
Segunda División B players
CF Damm players
CE Sabadell FC footballers
Sporting de Gijón players
Levante UD footballers
CD Badajoz players
Spanish football managers
La Liga managers
Segunda División managers
CD Badajoz managers
CD Numancia managers
CP Mérida managers
Albacete Balompié managers
Polideportivo Ejido managers
Recreativo de Huelva managers
CD Castellón managers
Villarreal CF B managers
RC Celta de Vigo managers
Real Zaragoza managers
UD Las Palmas managers
Real Valladolid managers
Sporting de Gijón managers
Super League Greece managers
Aris Thessaloniki F.C. managers
Spanish expatriate football managers
Expatriate football managers in Greece
Liverpool F.C. non-playing staff
Spanish expatriate sportspeople in England
Birmingham City F.C. non-playing staff